Joel Lester Cracraft (born July 31, 1942), is an American paleontologist and ornithologist. He received a PhD in 1969 from Columbia University (Functional Morphology of Locomotion in Birds).

His research interests include: theory and methods of comparative biology, evolutionary theory, biological diversification, systematics, the evolution of morphological systems, historical biogeography, molecular systematics and evolution.

From 1970 he has been a research associate at the Field Museum, Chicago; from 1970 to 1992, full professor at the University of Illinois; from 1993 to 1994, acting director of the Center for Biodiversity and Conservation at the American Museum of Natural History; from 1992, adjunct professor at the City University of New York; from 1997 adjunct professor at Columbia University; from 1992 curator at AMNH; and from 2002 Lamont Curator of Birds at AMNH.

Taxa authored
Certhiasomus (2015)
Hirundineinae (2009)
Microrhopiini (2009)

Publications 

 

Cracraft, J. (1988) The major clades of birds in: The phylogeny and classification of the tetrapods 1: 339–361.

References

External links
Profile: Joel Cracraft (AMNH video)
Joel Cracraft interview (from Organization for Tropical Studies)

Living people
1942 births
American taxonomists
American paleontologists
American ornithologists
Columbia University alumni
University of Oklahoma alumni
Louisiana State University alumni
University of Illinois faculty
City University of New York faculty
Columbia University faculty
20th-century American geologists
20th-century American zoologists
21st-century American geologists
21st-century American zoologists